Nancy Krikor Tchaylian (born 28 May 1991) is a Lebanese football and futsal player who plays as an attacking midfielder for Saudi Arabian club Al Shabab.

Club career 
On 27 August 2019, Tchaylian joined SAS. She helped her team finish runners-up of the 2019 WAFF Women's Clubs Championship as the tournament's best player. On 21 January 2020, Tchaylian joined Kuwaiti futsal club Al-Arabi. In December 2021, Tchaylian played for Police Club in the Maldives.

Tchaylian moved to Al Shabab, competing in the 2022–23 Saudi Women's Premier League, in October 2022. She scored a hat-trick on 21 October, in a 3–3 draw against Al-Nassr in the second matchday.

Honours 
Sadaka
 Lebanese Women's Football League: 2010–11, 2011–12, 2012–13
 Lebanese Women's FA Cup: 2010–11, 2011–12

SAS
 Lebanese Women's Football League: 2014–15, 2019–20, 2021–22
 Lebanese Women's FA Cup: 2014–15

FC Beirut
 Lebanese Women's FA Cup: 2015–16
 Lebanese Women's Super Cup: 2015–16

Zouk Mosbeh
 Lebanese Women's Football League: 2017–18
 Lebanese Women's FA Cup: 2016–17, 2017–18
 Lebanese Women's Super Cup: 2017

Individual
 WAFF Women's Clubs Championship Best Player winner: 2019
 Lebanese Women's Football League Best Player winner: 2010–11
 Lebanese Women's Football League top goalscorer: 2008–09, 2016–17

See also
 List of Lebanon women's international footballers

References

External links

 
 
 
 

1991 births
Living people
People from Matn District
Lebanese women's footballers
Lebanese women's futsal players
Lebanese people of Armenian descent
Ethnic Armenian sportspeople
Women's association football midfielders
Al Ansar FC (women) players
Athletico SC players
Sadaka SC women's footballers
Stars Association for Sports players
Zouk Mosbeh SC footballers
Al-Arabi SC (Kuwait) women's footballers
Lebanese Women's Football League players
Saudi Women's Premier League players
Lebanon women's international footballers
Lebanese women's expatriate futsal players
Lebanese expatriate women's footballers
Lebanese expatriate sportspeople in Kuwait
Lebanese expatriate sportspeople in the Maldives
Lebanese expatriate sportspeople in Saudi Arabia
Expatriate women's futsal players in Kuwait
Expatriate women's futsal players in the Maldives
Expatriate women's footballers in Saudi Arabia